Helmut Lamp (born 3 July 1946) is a German politician of the Christian Democratic Union (CDU) and former member of the German Bundestag.

Life 
Helmut Lamp was a member of the German Bundestag for the first time from 1990 to 1998. On 28 March 2000, he succeeded the late Gert Willner as a member of the Bundestag, where he remained until the end of the 14th parliamentary term in 2002. On 18 June 2003, he moved back into the Bundestag as a successor to the retired Member of Parliament Angelika Volquartz and was again a Member of the Bundestag until the end of the 15th parliamentary term in 2005. In the 16th legislative period until 2009, Lamp was again a successor since 20 December 2007, this time for the resigned Member of Parliament Carl-Eduard von Bismarck.

Literature

References

1946 births
Members of the Bundestag for Schleswig-Holstein
Members of the Bundestag 2005–2009
Members of the Bundestag 2002–2005
Members of the Bundestag 1998–2002
Members of the Bundestag 1994–1998
Members of the Bundestag 1990–1994
Members of the Bundestag for the Christian Democratic Union of Germany
Living people